Kim Sun-woo (born October 17, 1983) is a South Korean football player who played for Seongnam Ilhwa Chunma.

Kim previously played for Incheon United and Pohang Steelers in the K League.

External links

References

1983 births
Living people
South Korean footballers
Incheon United FC players
Changwon City FC players
Ulsan Hyundai Mipo Dockyard FC players
Pohang Steelers players
Seongnam FC players
K League 1 players
Korea National League players
Dongguk University alumni
Association football forwards